Kaabong District is a district in the Northern Region of Uganda. The district headquarters are in the town of Kaabong.

Location
Kaabong District is bordered by South Sudan to the northwest, Kenya to the northeast and the east, Moroto District to the southeast, Kotido District to the south, and Karenga District to the west. In July 2019, the newly former Karenga District was split off from Kaabong District.

Overview
Kaabong District became functional on 1 July 2005. Prior to that, it was known as Dodoth County in Kotido District. The district is part of the Karamoja sub-region, home to an estimated 1.2 million Karimojong.

Kaabong has two counties: Dodoth East County and Dodoth West County. This is divided into one town council, Kaabong, and thirteen sub-counties: Karenga, Lobalangit, Kawalakol, Kapedo, Lolelia, Lodiko, Kathile, Sidok, Kalapata, Kamion, Kaabong East, Kaabong West and  Loyoro.

Geography
Kaabong District has a rocky landscape with hills and valleys. The vegetation is primarily bushes and shrubs. The climatic/weather conditions of Kaabong District are more diverse with various soil types, vegetation and altitudes. There are some areas that contain savannah vegetation, but most of the district is semi-arid with thorny shrubs. There is only one annual season of cultivation. Kidepo Valley National Park is located in the district, by road, north of the district headquarters at Kaabong.

Population
In 1991, the national population census estimated the population of the district at about 91,200. The national census in 2002 estimated the population of the district at approximately 202,800. The annual population growth rate in the district, between 2002 and 2012, was calculated at 7%. In 2012, it is estimated that the population of Kaabong District was about 395,200.

Notable people
Simon Lokodo, politician and catholic priest

See also
 Karamoja sub-region
 Karimojong
 Kidepo Valley National Park
 Districts of Uganda

References

External links
Starving Kaabong Residents Trek to Kenya to Beg for Food

 
Karamoja
Districts of Uganda
Northern Region, Uganda